The 1987 Volvo Tennis Chicago was a men's tennis tournament played on indoor carpet courts at the UIC Pavilion in Chicago, Illinois in the United States that was part of the 1987 Nabisco Grand Prix. It was the third edition of the tournament and was held from March 30 through April 5, 1987. Third-seeded Tim Mayotte won the singles title.

Finals

Singles
 Tim Mayotte defeated  David Pate 6–4, 6–2
 It was Mayotte's 2nd singles title of the year and the 4th of his career.

Doubles
 Paul Annacone /  Christo van Rensburg defeated  Mike De Palmer /  Gary Donnelly 6–3, 7–6

References

External links
 ITF tournament edition details

Volvo Tennis Chicago
Volvo Tennis Chicago
Volvo Tennis Chicago
Volvo Tennis Chicago
Volvo Tennis Chicago